Other Voices is a peer-reviewed open-access academic journal of cultural criticism and cultural studies founded in 1996 at the University of Pennsylvania. Other Voices publishes interdisciplinary essays, interviews, roundtable discussions, lecture transcriptions, audio and video lectures, multimedia projects, translations and reviews in the arts and humanities. It covers developments in literature, arts, and culture through various historical, critical, and theoretical methods. The journal is edited by Vance Bell and Joshua Schuster.

Other Voices is archived by Stanford University's LOCKSS project.

External links 
 

Cultural journals
Publications established in 1997
Open access journals